James Adger Smyth was Mayor of Charleston, South Carolina for two terms between 1896 and 1903.

Smyth was born on June 8, 1837, in Charleston, South Carolina. His father, Thomas Smyth, was pastor of the Second Presbyterian Church in Charleston; his mother, Margaret Milligan Adger Smyth, was the daughter of a Charleston shipping merchant, James Adger, making his uncle the missionary John Bailey Adger.
He attended Doctor Miller's Preparatory School, the Charleston High School, and Professor Sachtleben's School. He graduated from the College of Charleston in 1858 and began working at his uncles' wholesale hardware firm, J.E. Adger & Company. He married Annie Ransom Briggs, the daughter of Cedar Grove Plantation owner, Thomas Whitaker Briggs in March 1860. In 1862, he enlisted and fought with Company A of the 25th Regiment of the South Carolina Volunteers until the end of the Civil War in 1865.

After the war he resumed work with his maternal uncles, Robert Adger and Joseph Ellison Adger, at J.E. Adger & Company. During his ten years in the company he became an active member in the Chamber of Commerce. In 1875, Smyth became an independent cotton broker, and along with his cousin, Andrew Moffett Adger, started the company Smyth and Adger, successfully brokering cotton from North Carolina, Georgia, and Alabama.

Smyth grew increasingly involved in local politics. He was member of the State and County Democratic Executive Committees (1876), City Council (1885), and mayor for two four-year terms (1895 to 1903). He retired in 1904.

He lived at 14 Legare St., Charleston, South Carolina from 1879 until he died on April 25, 1920.

References

Mayors of Charleston, South Carolina
1837 births
1920 deaths
South Carolina Democrats